Vasili Aleksandrovich Yablonskiy (born 2 January 1980) is a former Russian football player.

References

1980 births
Living people
Russian footballers
FC Elista players
Russian Premier League players
FC Yenisey Krasnoyarsk players
FC Arsenal Tula players
FC Spartak-UGP Anapa players
FC Sokol Saratov players
FC Volgar Astrakhan players
Association football forwards